Coprosma crassifolia, is a forest shrub native to New Zealand. It is found from the coast up to approximately 600 metres in both the North and South Islands.

Coprosma crassifolia is an erect shrub growing up to 4 metres high with red-brown branchlets, and leaves that are round, stiff and remotely spaced. The berry is translucent and holds a white seed within.

References

Flora of New Zealand
crassifolia